Myron Bohdanovych Markevych (born 1 February 1951) is a Ukrainian football manager and a former midfielder.

He worked as a manager in the Ukrainian Premier League and the Ukraine national football team. He holds the record for coaching the most matches (500 as on August 15, 2011) in the Ukrainian Premier League.

Career

Playing
He played as a midfielder for FC Karpaty Lviv (reserves), SCA Lviv, FC Spartak Ordzhinikidze, and FC Torpedo Lutsk.

Coaching

He graduated from the Institute of Physical Education (Lviv) and the Supreme school of coaches in Moscow in 1983. He has managed a number of teams, devoting most of his career to Karpaty Lviv and Metalist Kharkiv. He last served as manager of Dnipro Dnipropetrovsk.

Markevych was appointed head coach of Ukraine's national football team in early February 2010, but left six months later, submitting his resignation to the Football Federation of Ukraine (FFU) by fax on 21 August 2010. Initially, the legal department of FFU stated that such a document could only be submitted in its original form and the fax copy could not be accepted. Ultimately, the FFU accepted his resignation and appointed Yuriy Kalitvintsev as caretaker manager.

Personal information
Markevych is of Polish descent by maternal grandfather. He is fluent in English and Polish. He is married and is the father of two sons, Ostap Markevych and Yuriy Markevych.

Career record

Honours

Manager

Club
Karpaty Lviv
Ukrainian Cup runners-up (2): 1993, 1999
Ukrainian Premier League 3rd place: 1998

Metalist Kharkiv
Ukrainian Premier League runners-up: 2013
Ukrainian Premier League 3rd place (6) 2007, 2008, 2009, 2010, 2011, 2012

Dnipro
UEFA Europa League runners-up (1): 2014–15
Ukrainian Premier League 3rd place: 2015

References

External links

 

1951 births
Living people
People from Vynnyky
Lviv State University of Physical Culture alumni
Higher School of Coaches alumni
Soviet footballers
Association football midfielders
Ukrainian people of Polish descent
FC Spartak Vladikavkaz players
FC Volyn Lutsk players
Soviet Second League players
Soviet football managers
Ukrainian football managers
FC Volyn Lutsk managers
FC Podillya Khmelnytskyi managers
FC Kryvbas Kryvyi Rih managers
FC Karpaty Lviv managers
FC Metalurh Zaporizhzhia managers
FC Anzhi Makhachkala managers
FC Metalist Kharkiv managers
Ukraine national football team managers
FC Dnipro managers
Soviet Second League managers
Ukrainian Premier League managers
Russian Premier League managers
Ukrainian expatriate football managers
Expatriate football managers in Russia
Ukrainian expatriate sportspeople in Russia
Football Federation of Ukraine officials